Nevestka (English: Daughter-In-Law, Turkmen:Gelin) is a  1972 Turkmenistani film directed by Khodzha Kuli Narliyev, starring Maya-Gozel Aimedova, Aynabat Amanliyeva, and Baba Annanov. The film is about a woman who loses her husband during World War II and is forced to take care of her father-in-law in the desert.

Cast
Maya-Gozel Aimedova 		
Aynabat Amanliyeva 		
Baba Annanov 	
Ogulkurban Durdyyeva 			
Khommat Mullyk 		
Arslan Muradov 	
Khodzha Durdy Narliyev 		
Mergen Niyazov 			
Khodzhan Ovezgelenov

Reception
Nevestka has been called "the film that put Turkmen film on the map". Mira Liehm and Antonín J. Liehm note its "strong cinematic feeling for local settings". Michael Rouland calls it a "representation of Turkmen life at the edge of the desert during World War Two", writing that it "engages a rich genre in Soviet film: the tragedy of lives left on the home front while loved ones sacrificed their lives on the battlefront. Bridging the vast territorial and cultural spaces of the Soviet Union, the sacrifice of war and its suffering was a common theme of Soviet film".

References

External links
 

1972 films
Soviet-era Turkmenistan films
Soviet drama films
1972 drama films
World War II films
Films directed by Khodzha Kuli Narliyev